Graeme Hendrey Wood is a   nature reserve east of Bletchingley in Surrey. It is managed by the Surrey Wildlife Trust.

This former sand and gravel quarry is now a wood, with ash, oak, sycamore, sweet chestnut, hazel and silver birch. Ground flora include enchanter’s nightshade, bird's-nest orchid and dog’s mercury.

There is access from Rabies Heath Road.

References 

Surrey Wildlife Trust